Dunia Tanpa Koma (DTK) (English: The World without Commas) is the first TV series in Indonesia that has the season system. It tells the story of Raya (Dian Sastrowardoyo) who works as a reporter in the weekly magazine called, Target.  This TV series is starred with many Indonesia's top celebrities such as Tora Sudiro, and Cut Mini. The series combines many genres; thriller, action, and romance are all in this series. Creator, Leila Chudori, who is also a journalist in the Tempo magazine in Indonesia,  said that she wants to revive the television world in Indonesia that is deteriorating. It premiered on 9 September 2006. In season 1, the series concentrates to the drug syndicate that Raya and her friends are trying to publicize in Target. They got themselves in trouble, especially when one of the episodes has a murder case. The series is aired in RCTI at a primetime at 9pm on Saturdays and produced by SinemArt.

Season 1
Raya (Dian Sastrowardoyo) is starting a new career in journalism in a weekly magazine called Target. An independent girl who rides a bicycle to the office, she found herself in rivalry against Seruni (Wulan Guritno), a fellow journalist who has worked for many years in Target. Seruni always teases and criticises her at the daily meeting. She is jealous of her because Raya is treated differently amongst the staff in Target. Nevertheless somewhere along the middle of the season, they become closer even though they were rivals before. Target 's editor-in-chief, Bayu (Tora Sudiro), falls in love with Raya, although he already has a fiancée who works in the same office and Raya already has a boyfriend. Raya's boyfriend, Bram (Fauzi Baadilah) works in the Harian Kini (Daily Kini),  Target 's rival in the journalism world. Their personal relationship sometimes gets them in trouble, especially when Raya accidentally told Bram a very exclusive news that was going to be Target 's headline. Another character is Retno, Bayu's best friend and partner in the job who is still single.

Episodes

1. Hari-Hari Pertama (The First Days)
In one morning meeting at Target 's headquarter, the President Director, Bondan Pratomo was mad at his staff because they didn't cover the story of the arrest of an actor, Arifin, which became the headline story of their rival, Harian Kini (The Daily Kini). Arifin was found earlier at dawn by the police having a rave party in his hotel room. In the same morning a new reporter, Raya Maryadi, a fresh graduate from the Politics department from the New York University started her first day in journalism by working for Target. She is the daughter of Bondan's best friend, Mr. Maryadi.  Seruni, a very experienced journalist, was jealous of her because she was treated differently amongst the staff because she is the daughter of the Big Boss 's best friend. Raya's first assignment was to interview Indonesia's top model, Mariana Renata, who had been in Target 's wanted list to be interviewed. When Raya tried to interview Mariana, she met Bramantyo, a legendary reporter from Harian Kini who was writing about Arifin's arrest.  She was tipped off by Bram to the Red Bar which was the place where celebrities shoot up.  She didn't interview Mariana, what she found was overdosed people.  She also met her old friend, Jendra Aditya, owner of Red Bar who used to be Raya's boyfriend.  Both of them had studied in the United States, Raya in New York City under scholarship, and Jendra in Los Angeles under his family's support.  Raya went home with Bram.  When she told him that she and Jendra used to go out, Bram was surprised. He then told her that Jendra was the leader of a drug syndicate. Since then, both of them fell in love. From Bram's tips, Raya interviewed Mariana. Not only did she interview her, but Mariana actually came to Target 's office, whose arrival surprised Raya. Her fellow co-workers who had thought that she was not good enough applaused her.help

2. Langkah Awal (The First Step)
The police are very keen to find more about the drug syndicate. Etty, a seemingly regular housewife with two children, was arrested for dealing drugs. At the office, Bayu complimented Raya for her story about Mariana and as a result of that, she was teased by Seruni. Raya was not only given the task to write the Entertainment section, but she also got a new assignment to write stories about the drug syndicate. Raya went to the Red Bar. She interviewed one of the bartenders, Dodo, who was asked earlier by the police. Raya also saw Oli Hamdani, one of Jendra's celebrity girlfriends sniffing cocaine. Raya's relationship with Bram developed. He dropped Raya off at her office. When Bayu saw them, he became jealous. Retno, Bayu's partner, told him that it was too early to be jealous. Bayu and Bram were rivals in getting exclusive news. Andi RIF, made a cameo appearance in this episode. When he was performing at the Red Bar, Jendra's staff kidnapped Dodo with the intention to finish him up. However, Dodo was still alive though unconscious.

3. Red Bar
Oli Hamdani was sweating, her hair was messy, her face was pale, she was sitting on the side of a bed. The room was filled with needles and drugs. At the office, Bayu decided to put Raya officially in the investigation team for the drug syndicate. He did that because he was amazed by Raya's works on Mariana Renata and Jendra's status in the drug syndicate. Seruni couldn't accept working in the same team as Raya. Meanwhile, Dodo was recuperating in hospital. He had broken legs and crushed ribs. Raya, and Bayu came to the hospital and tried to cheer Dodo's wife, Annisa.  They came because Raya felt guilty for what happened even though Bayu had told her that it wasn't her fault, Dodo had been the target of Jendra's men. At the hospital, Raya and Bayu met Bram. The situation was getting intense when Bram held Raya's shoulder. Because of his jealousy, Bayu went back to his office, leaving Raya with Bram. Bram took her out of town to a waterfall and kissed her. Desi, Bayu's fiancée who also works in Target, was jealous of Bayu because he didn't tell her he was going with Raya to the hospital. She was quite suspicious of him because he hadn't decided the date of their wedding. Raya interviewed Jendra at Red Bar. However, during the interview Jendra didn't answer what Raya asked. Instead he was complaining why Raya decided to jump into journalism  despite the fact that she graduated from Politics. The interview bored her. Meanwhile, Oli was found dead in the Red Bar because of overdose. Her body was taken by the ambulance for autopsy as requested by the police. Raya was surprised as she saw Oli earlier with Jendra before she interviewed him.

4. Raya & Yoan 
5. Sidik Jarimu Di Sekujur Tubuhku (Your Finger Prints Around My Body) 
6. All The Right Moves 
7. Closure 
8. Sonny Krisnantara 
9. His World Against Her World, 
10. Setangkai Nista Untuk Mutiara 
11. Jendra Aditya 
12. Hakim Daus (Daus The Judge) 
13. Marita 
14. Sebuah Dunia Bernama Raya (A World Called Raya)

Indonesian drama television series
2006 Indonesian television series debuts
2000s Indonesian television series